The First National Band or Michael Nesmith and The First National Band was a short-lived American collaborative band, led by Monkee Michael Nesmith.  During the two active years, The First National Band released three albums in the country rock genre in 1970 and 1971.

Pre-First National Band
During his time in The Monkees, Nesmith was unhappy with the bubblegum pop records that musical director Don Kirshner was providing for the group, and fought to get his own compositions to be recorded under the Monkees name. Before The Monkees, Nesmith had released a handful of singles under the name "Michael Blessing" which were Bob Dylan/folk rock inspired.

In 1968, Nesmith released The Wichita Train Whistle Sings as a side-project from the Monkees and, due to continued frustration, bought himself out of his Monkees contract altogether in 1970.

Forming The First National Band
In 1969, before Nesmith had left the Monkees, it was clear to both him and his friend John Ware that The Monkees were soon coming to an end. Ware suggested that Nesmith form another band with Ware and their mutual friend John London and put his studio connections to good use while he still had the chance. When he was free from his contract, Nesmith took Ware up on his offer, so long as Orville "Red" Rhodes would join.   Also, Nesmith did not want to "just do that power trio thing". The First National Band was the start of a long collaboration between Nesmith and Rhodes, which lasted until Rhodes's death in 1995.

Career
The First National Band endured many problems in its short career. Nesmith's association with the Monkees had made him a joke to some people and as a result many fellow musicians would not take his music seriously. During one of the band's first gigs, they played alongside Gram Parsons and his new band The Flying Burrito Brothers. Nesmith recalls how others seeing a former Monkee decked out in a Nudie suit with a steel player in tow must have been laughable to seasoned Country devotees, such as Parsons. However, their unique sound was enough to win over the LA club scene and create a new image for Nesmith. Nesmith also requested of venues that they not promote or reference his being a Monkee/ex-Monkee in their advertising or the band's introduction. Unfortunately, many Emcees would ignore his request and Nesmith would become irritated with them as well as with folks who would shout out requests of "Last Train to Clarksville" and/or other Monkee hits.

During his stint with The Monkees, Nesmith had accumulated an extensive back-catalogue of songs which had not been heard by anyone. This meant that, in their short time as a band, The First National Band was able to release three albums in less than a 12-month span. July 1970 saw the release of Magnetic South, which was the first and "blue" in the trilogy of "red, white and blue" albums and reached No. 143 on the Billboard Albums Chart. This album contained the inclusion of five songs which hailed from Nesmith's Monkees days. It also contained the song "Joanne", which, due to a lot of radio play, surprised the band by reaching No. 21 on the Billboard Singles Chart. However, despite this chart success, the single did not gain the band commercial success because the band were in Britain, on a tour of working-man's clubs, which lasted until "Joanne" had dropped out of the American charts and sunk without a trace. Ware claimed that the band's management believed that, as the Monkees weren't as well known in Britain, it would be the perfect place to try to break in this new change in musical direction.

November 1970 saw the release of the band's second "red" album, Loose Salute, which reached No. 159 on the Billboard Album chart. This contained the minor hit "Silver Moon" (Billboard #42) and a re-working of the Monkees song, "Listen to the Band".

After the band had returned from Britain, and after "Joanne's" success had long since been forgotten, work was started on the band's final "white" album, Nevada Fighter. Recording for this album started in October 1970, but things within the group started falling apart, which led to both Ware and London leaving the group the following month. Released in May 1971, it failed to chart.

After The First National Band
Nesmith and Rhodes continued to work together, and recruited a new set of musicians, consisting of members of Elvis Presley's band to work on Nesmith's fifth album, Tantamount to Treason Vol. 1. This was released in May 1972 and credited to "Michael Nesmith & The Second National Band". Nesmith and Rhodes continued to collaborate on Nesmith's later solo albums up until Rhodes's death in 1995. Nesmith continued to release solo albums, the last being Rays in 2006.

During Nesmith's 2013 tour of the U.S., an isolated backing track of Rhodes playing the pedal steel from the song "Thanx for the Ride" from Loose Salute was played while Nesmith and his band accompanied the track.

First National Band Redux (2018)

Nesmith announced The first National Band would be returning with 5 concerts in early 2018 in southern and northern California under the banner "The First National Band Redux". This incarnation of the First National Band is largely in name only, since other than Nesmith, all of the other members are either dead or retired; Nesmith's sons, Christian and Jonathan, are among the members of the new First National Band lineup. The second First National Band includes, in addition to the Nesmiths, Jason Chesney on bass, Pete Finney on steel guitar, and Chistopher Allis on drums, along with backing vocalists Amy Spear and Circe Link. To coincide with the tour, the band's three studio albums will be re-released on colored vinyl in late March, from oldies label Sundazed. Christian and Jonathan also contributed to The Monkees' Christmas album Christmas Party. The band continued to tour throughout 2018 and released a live album from their show at the Troubadour.

Nesmith died December 10, 2021.

Discography

References

External Links
 

1970 establishments in the United States
1972 disestablishments in the United States
American country rock groups
Michael Nesmith
Musical groups established in 1970
Musical groups disestablished in 1972